Pegaso was the name of at least two ships of the Italian Navy and may refer to:

 , a  launched in 1905 and discarded in 1923.
 , an  launched in 1936 and scuttled in 1943.

Italian Navy ship names